Mary Elizabeth Branch (May 29, 18811944) was a Black American female educator.

Early life and education
Branch was born on May 29, 1881 in Farmville, Virginia, to formerly enslaved parents Tazewell and Harriet Branch. Her father served two terms the Virginia House of Delegates. Both her parents were literate, and taught Mary at home, though she also attended school. After high school she earned her teaching degree at Virginia State University, and taught at an elementary school in Blackstone, Virginia.

Professional career
Branch returned to Virginia State College to teach; she stayed there for twenty years, and at the same time earned a BA (1922) and then an MA (1925) from the University of Chicago.

After Virginia State College, Branch became a dean at Vashon High School in St Louis. After that she became president at Tillotson College in Austin, Texas, where she stayed until retirement. When she got there, the college had seen enrollment decline, and the year before Branch's arrival had been demoted to a junior college for women. Branch had new buildings built and existing ones renovated. The library was enlarged, and so was the number of teachers. With a successful recruitment strategy, aided by her ability to raise funds, she managed to grow enrollment from less than 150 in 1930 to 500 after a few years. She also strengthened ties with the community.

After five years, Tillston became a co-ed four-year college. It became a member of the American Association of Colleges. Branch was the first and only African American female president of an institution in this Association. In 1944, she assisted in establishing the United Negro College Fund (UNCF) and she was also the President of the Austine chapter. She died in 1944 in Baltimore, Maryland.

Awards
In 1935, Lyndon B. Johnson appointed her to the National Youth's Administration's Negro Advisory Board for Texas. At her alma mater, Virginia State University named a residence after Branch. Branch was awarded degrees of honor from Virginia State College and Howard University.

References

1881 births
1944 deaths